Meno is a Socratic dialogue written by Plato.

Meno may also refer to:

Places
 Meno, Oklahoma, United States

People
 Meno, a transliteration of the Ancient Greek name Menon
 Jenni Meno (born 1970), American figure skater
 Joe Meno (born 1974), American fiction writer
 Meno Burg (1789-1853), Jewish Prussian military officer

Other uses
 Meno (general), the Thessalian general and title character in Plato's Meno
 Meno's slave, a character in Plato's Meno
 meno, a musical term meaning less, as in meno mosso (less quickly); see

See also

 
 Menno (disambiguation)
 Menon (disambiguation)
 Menos (disambiguation)